Fuhrman is a surname and may refer to:

Chet Fuhrman, coach with the National Football League's Pittsburgh Steelers
Chris Fuhrman (1960–1991), American novelist, author of The Dangerous Lives of Altar Boys
Elina Fuhrman, Russian-American travel and lifestyle journalist based in Los Angeles
Isabelle Fuhrman (born 1997), American actress
Joanna Fuhrman (born 1972), American poet and professor
Joel Fuhrman, (born 1953), American author, physician, speaker, who advocates a "micronutrient-rich" diet
Mark Fuhrman (born 1952), former detective of the Los Angeles Police Department
Ollie Fuhrman (1896–1969), American Major League Baseball catcher
Robert A. Fuhrman (1925–2009), American engineer who developed the Polaris Missile and Poseidon missile
Susan Fuhrman, the tenth president of Teachers College, Columbia University

See also
Fuhrman and Forster Company, meatpacking and sausage manufacturing company located in Chicago
Fuhrman grade, histologic grading schema for renal cell carcinoma
Fuhrman tapes, taped interviews given by Los Angeles police officer Mark Fuhrman to writer Laura McKinny between 1985 and 1994
Furman v. Georgia, a US Supreme Court decision that ruled on the requirement for a degree of consistency in the application of the death penalty
Furman (disambiguation)